Reinette (French for Little Queen), often Rennet in English, and popular in Italian cuisine as Renetta,  is the name of a number of apple cultivars.

Cultivars
Reine des reinettes
Reine des Reinettes Rouge, diploid
Reinette à Longue Queue, diploid
Reinette Ananas
Reinette Baumann
Reinette Bergamotte, an apple-pear graft-chimaera
Reinette Clochard
Reinette Courthay
Reinette d'Amérique
Reinette d'Armorique
Blenheim Orange
Reinette de Bretagne
Reinette de Brive
Reinette de Champagne
Reinette de Chênée,
Cox's Orange Pippin
Reinette de Flandre
Reinette de France
Reinette de l'Hopital,
Reinette de Landsberg
Reinette de Savoie
Reinette de Servin
Reinette de Tournai
Reinette dorée
Reinette d'Orléans
Reinette du Canada
Reinette du Mans
Reinette Duquesne
Reinette étoilée
Reinette franche
Reinette grise de Lorient
Reinette Hernaut
Reinette jaune sucrée
Reinette Newtown or Reinette Albemarle
Reinette Oldenburg
Ribston Pippin
Reinette Sanguine du Rhin

References

Apples